Francesca Bentley (born 26 June 2001) is an English footballer who plays as a goalkeeper for Bristol City of the Women's Championship.

She has previously played in the youth ranks at Manchester City, Manchester United on loan at Sheffield United, Blackburn Rovers and Bristol City, and has represented England at under-17 and under-23 level.

Club career

Early career
Bentley joined Manchester United aged nine and remained at the club for five years. In 2015, she joined local rivals Manchester City due to the limited first team opportunities available at her former club.

Manchester City
In July 2017, Bentley signed with the Manchester City development squad for the 2017–18 season and became a regular for the club. In April 2018, she helped the club win the FA Development League Cup. Bentley was named as an unused substitute for the first team on two occasions as they finished runners-up in the Women's Super League and the FA WSL Cup.

Manchester United
On 1 July 2018, Bentley returned to her former club and joined Manchester United ahead of their inaugural season in the FA Women's Championship, one of seven players to return to the senior side having played for the club at youth level. She made her senior debut as a 59th-minute substitute in a Championship game against Millwall with the score at 6–0. The game finished 8–0.

2018–19 season: Loan to Sheffield United

On 8 February 2019, she was loaned to fellow Championship side Sheffield United until the end of the season. She played in six games during the loan, conceded four goals and won every game. She also notably assisted fellow Manchester United loanee Ebony Salmon's goal in a 2–1 win over Tottenham Hotspur.

2019–20 season
Bentley missed the start of the 2019–20 season after suffering a fractured humerus while on international duty with England under-18s.

2020–21 season: Loan to Blackburn Rovers
On 1 September 2020, Bentley signed a season-long loan deal with Blackburn Rovers of the FA Women's Championship. She made her league debut five days later in a 3–0 defeat to Leicester City. She made four appearances before United recalled her in December.

2021–22 season: Loan to Bristol City
On 6 August 2021, Bentley signed a new two-year contract with Manchester United before joining Championship side Bristol City on a season-long loan. She made her debut on 29 August in Bristol City's opening game of the season, a 4–3 defeat to Crystal Palace. She played 22 games in total, keeping ten clean sheets as Bristol finished third and was named Young Player of the Season at the club's end of season awards.

Bristol City
Following a season-long loan, Bentley joined Bristol City permanently on 1 July 2022 on a two-year contract.

International career
On 28 April 2017, Bentley made her debut for England under-17s in a 2–0 defeat to the United States. Six months later, she made her competitive debut and kept her first clean sheet for England in a 10–0 victory against Latvia in UEFA Women's Under-17 Championship qualification. Bentley made five appearances to help England qualify for the tournament.

Personal life
While playing for Manchester United, she enrolled onto the BTEC Level 3 Extended Diploma Business course at Wigan and Leigh College.

Career statistics

References

External links
 Profile at ManUtd.com
 
 

2001 births
Living people
English women's footballers
Women's association football goalkeepers
Women's Super League players
Manchester City W.F.C. players
Manchester United W.F.C. players
Sheffield United W.F.C. players
Blackburn Rovers L.F.C. players
Bristol City W.F.C. players
Women's Championship (England) players
England women's youth international footballers